A cable length or  length of cable is a nautical unit of measure equal to one tenth of a nautical mile or approximately 100 fathoms. Owing to anachronisms and varying techniques of measurement, a cable length can be anywhere from 169 to 220 metres, depending on the standard used. The unit is named after the length of a ship's anchor cable in the Age of Sail. 

The definition varies:

 International: 185.2 m, equivalent to  nautical mile
 Imperial (Admiralty): 185.32 m, or  nautical mile, about 101 fathoms
 US customary (US Navy): 219.5 metres, 120 fathoms (720 feet)

See also
 Conversion of units

References
 . Also "fathom", from the same work (pp. 88–89, retrieved 12 January 2017).
 .

Nautical terminology
Units of length
Customary units of measurement in the United States